The canton of Saint-Gilles is an administrative division of the Gard department, southern France. Its borders were modified at the French canton reorganisation which came into effect in March 2015. Its seat is in Saint-Gilles.

It consists of the following communes:
 
Caveirac
Clarensac
Générac
Langlade
Milhaud
Nîmes (partly)
Saint-Côme-et-Maruéjols
Saint-Dionisy
Saint-Gilles

References

Cantons of Gard